Threebear soil is the official state soil of the U.S. state of Idaho.

Profile
The Threebear series consists of moderately well drained soils formed in silty sediments with a thick mantle of volcanic ash. These soils are moderately deep to a fragipan. The name “Threebear” is derived from a creek in Latah County, Idaho. These soils are on hills with slopes of 5 to 35 percent.

Threebear soils are used mainly for timber production and wildlife habitat. The potential natural vegetation is western redcedar, grand fir, Douglas-fir, western larch, and western white pine.

References
Idaho State soil

See also
Pedology (soil study)
Soil types
List of U.S. state soils

Pedology
Soil in the United States
Geology of Idaho
Symbols of Idaho
Types of soil